The Progressive Blues Experiment is the debut album by American blues rock musician Johnny Winter. He recorded it in August 1968 at the Vulcan Gas Company, an Austin music club, with his original trio of Tommy Shannon on bass guitar and John "Red" Turner on drums.  The album features a mix of Winter originals and older blues songs, including the standards "Rollin' and Tumblin'", "Help Me", and "Forty-Four".

Local Austin, Texas-based Sonobeat Records issued the album with a plain white cover in late 1968. After Winter signed to Columbia Records, the rights were sold to Imperial Records, who reissued it in March 1969. The Imperial edition, with a new cover, reached number 40 on the Billboard 200 album chart. In 2005, Capitol issued a 24-bit remastered edition of the album on compact disc.

Track listing
Songwriters and track running times are taken from the original Sonobeat LP. Other releases may have different listings.

Personnel
Johnny Wintervocals, electric guitar, National steel guitar, mandolin, harmonica
Tommy Shannonbass guitar
John "Red" Turnerdrums

Footnotes

References

External links

Johnny Winter albums
1968 debut albums
Imperial Records albums